Pakistan competed at the 2012 Summer Olympics in London, from 27 July to 12 August 2012. This was the nation's sixteenth appearance at the Olympics, except the 1980 Summer Olympics in Moscow, because of its support to the United States boycott.

Pakistan Olympic Association sent a total of 21 athletes, 19 men and 2 women, to compete in 4 different sports. Four of their athletes were selected to the team under wild card entries, without having qualified. Men's field hockey was the only team-sport in which Pakistan had its representation in these Olympic games. Field hockey team captain Sohail Abbas was the nation's flag bearer at the opening ceremony. Pakistan, however, failed to win a single Olympic medal in London since the 1992 Summer Olympics in Barcelona, where the men's field hockey team won the bronze.

Athletics

Men

Women

Field hockey

Pakistan ensured its place in the men's event after winning a gold medal in the 2010 Asian Games held in Guangzhou, China.

Men's tournament

Roster

Pakistan is in Pool A of the men's competition.
Group play

7th/8th place game

Shooting

International Shooting Sport Federation has allocated a wild card for Pakistan enabling an entry for the shooting event in London Summer Olympics.

Men

Swimming

Federation of International Aquatics has allocated two wild cards for Pakistan enabling an entry for the swimming event in London Summer Olympics.

Men

Women

References

External links

Nations at the 2012 Summer Olympics
2012
2012 in Pakistani sport